Antonella Grassi is an Italian mathematician specializing in algebraic geometry and string theory.  She is a Fellow of the American Mathematical Society.

Education
Grassi received her Ph.D. from Duke University under the supervision of David R. Morrison.  Her dissertation was entitled "Minimal Models of Elliptic Threefolds."

Career and Service 
Grassi is currently Professor of Mathematics at the University of Pennsylvania in Philadelphia, Pennsylvania.  She has supervised two doctoral students, one at the University of Pennsylvania and the other at Università di Torino in Torino. She is an active participant in Women in Math at the University of Pennsylvania.

Grassi has been a leader and mentor in the Institute for Advanced Study Program for Women in Mathematics; in particular, she organized the 2007 program on Algebraic Geometry and Group Actions.

Honors

Grassi was elected to the 2018 class of fellows of the American Mathematical Society. Her citation read "For contributions to algebraic geometry and mathematical physics, and for leadership in mentoring programs."

References

20th-century American mathematicians
21st-century American mathematicians
Living people
Duke University alumni
Fellows of the American Mathematical Society
American women mathematicians
University of Pennsylvania faculty
Mathematicians at the University of Pennsylvania
20th-century women mathematicians
21st-century women mathematicians
Year of birth missing (living people)
Place of birth missing (living people)
20th-century American women
21st-century American women